Francis Joseph "Hank" Garrity (February 4, 1908 – September 1, 1962) was a professional baseball player. He played eight games in Major League Baseball for the Chicago White Sox in 1931, primarily as a catcher.

Early life 
Garrity was from the Jamaica Plain neighborhood of Boston.  In 1948, he was voted the best athlete to ever graduate from the Boston public schools.  Garrity attended College of the Holy Cross.

Baseball career 
Garrity joined the Chicago White Sox during the 1931 season, as part of a catching tandem that included Bennie Tate, Frank Grube and Butch Henline. In an eight-game career, he posted a batting average of .214 (3-for-14), including one double and two runs batted in.

Later life 
After his baseball career, Garrity served in the armed forces during World War II. He died in his home town of Boston, Massachusetts, at the age of 54.

References

External links 

Major League Baseball catchers
Chicago White Sox players
Albany Senators players
Holy Cross Crusaders baseball players
Baseball players from Massachusetts
American military personnel of World War II
1908 births
1962 deaths
Probation and parole officers
Burials at St. Joseph Cemetery (West Roxbury, Massachusetts)